Bisk can refer to:
A traditional Yazidi ceremony involving the first haircut
A misspelling of bisque (see bisque (disambiguation))
A shopkeeper from Splatoon 2